The 2015 A Lyga, also known as SMSCredit.lt A Lyga for sponsoring purposes was the 26th season of the A Lyga, the top-tier association football league of Lithuania. The season started in February 2015 and ended in November 2015. Žalgiris Vilnius are the defending champions.

Teams 
FK Ekranas and FK Banga failed to obtain a license to play in the A Lyga and were relegated alongside FK Dainava, which finished last in the 2014 A Lyga. They were replaced by FC Stumbras and FK Spyris from Kaunas, giving the city two football teams in the highest league for the first time since 2002, and FK Utenis from Utena. All three teams make their debut at the top level.

Stadiums and locations

Kit manufacturer and sponsors

League table

Results

First half of season

Second half of season

Top goalscorers

Top assists

References 

LFF Lyga seasons
1
Lith
Lith